Levi Stubbs (born Levi Stubbles, June 6, 1936 – October 17, 2008) was an American baritone singer, best known as the lead vocalist of the R&B group the Four Tops, who released a variety of Motown hit records during the 1960s and 1970s. He has been noted for his powerful, emotional, dramatic style of singing. In 1990, he was inducted into the Rock and Roll Hall of Fame as a member of the Four Tops.

Stubbs was also a voice artist in film and television, and provided the voice of "Audrey II", the alien plant in the 1986 musical horror comedy film Little Shop of Horrors (an adaption of the stage musical of the same name), as well as Mother Brain in the 1989 TV series Captain N: The Game Master. Stubbs was admired by his peers for his impressive vocal range, and influenced many later pop and soul artists, such as Daryl Hall of Hall and Oates.

Stubbs was born and spent much of his life in Detroit, Michigan. He had five children with his wife Clineice Stubbs, to whom he was married for almost 50 years. His last performance was at the Four Tops' "50th Anniversary Concert" on July 28, 2004, at the Detroit Opera House.

Early life and music career

Born in 1936 in Detroit, Stubbs had a brother, Joe, who later became a member of 100 Proof (Aged in Soul), The Falcons, The Contours and The Originals. His cousin was Jackie Wilson. Stubbs attended Detroit Pershing High School, where he met Abdul "Duke" Fakir. He began his professional singing career with friends Fakir, Renaldo "Obie" Benson and Lawrence Payton, forming a singing group called the Four Aims in 1954.

Two years later, after signing with Chess Records, the group changed their name to the Four Tops. The name change was meant to avoid confusion with the then-popular Ames Brothers. The Four Tops began as a supper-club act before signing to Motown Records in 1963. By the end of the decade, they had over a dozen hits. The most popular of their hits (all of which featured Stubbs on lead vocals) include "Ask the Lonely", "Baby I Need Your Loving", "I Can't Help Myself (Sugar Pie, Honey Bunch)", "It's the Same Old Song", "I'll Turn to Stone", "Reach Out I'll Be There", "Standing in the Shadows of Love", "Bernadette", "Still Water (Love)", "Ain't No Woman (Like the One I've Got)", as well as the late hit "Loco In Acapulco".

Although Stubbs was a natural baritone, most Four Tops' hits were written in a tenor range to give the lead vocals a sense of urgency.

Despite being the most prominent member of the group, Stubbs refused to have separate billing (in contrast to other Motown acts such as Smokey Robinson and the Miracles and Diana Ross and the Supremes), and he also turned down several offers for a solo career, out of loyalty to his bandmates. Stubbs and the other Tops remained a team until Lawrence Payton died in 1997, at which point Theo Peoples took his place. The Four Tops were inducted into the Rock and Roll Hall of Fame in 1990 and the Rhythm and Blues Music Hall of Fame in 2013. They have sold over 50 million records worldwide.

During the band's long career it was signed to the Motown, ABC Dunhill, Arista and Casablanca record labels, and Stubbs' vocals influenced many later pop and soul artists, such as Daryl Hall of Hall and Oates. Hall has remarked that Stubbs' "unique" style rendered the Four Tops' material "timeless". Other musical peers expressing admiration for the Four Tops' work include Lonnie Jordan of War and Smokey Robinson of The Miracles, among many others.

In 2000, Theo Peoples replaced Stubbs as lead singer after Stubbs suffered a stroke, with Ronnie McNeir taking the place that Lawrence Payton originally held. Renaldo Benson died on July 1, 2005, leaving Duke Fakir as the only surviving member of the Four Tops' original lineup. Stubb's final performance with the Four Tops was at the group's "50th Anniversary Concert" on July 28, 2004 at the Detroit Opera House.

Voice acting
Stubbs provided the voice of the carnivorous plant Audrey II in the 1986 film version of the musical Little Shop of Horrors, in which he sang the Oscar-nominated "Mean Green Mother from Outer Space". He also was the voice of Mother Brain in the animated TV series Captain N: The Game Master (1989).

Stubbs also guest-starred in a number of TV shows as himself. Berry Gordy offered him the role of Louis McKay in the 1972 film Lady Sings the Blues, which would have starred him opposite Diana Ross as Billie Holiday. Stubbs turned the role down, however, once again not wishing to overshadow the other members of the Four Tops.

Reputation 
Stubbs has been regarded by some as one of the quintessential male soul singers. According to AllMusic's Ed Hogan, the vocalist had a "pleading urgency in his voice that perfectly captured the longing anxiousness of the songs written by the producing trio of Holland-Dozier-Holland". War band member Lonnie Jordan later told Billboard.com he felt "blessed" to meet Stubbs, and thought that the Four Tops singer's "voice was so good he was just, like, from another planet."

Personal life
Stubbs and his wife Clineice were married (for 48 years) from 1960 until his death in 2008. The couple had five children along with 11 grandchildren and 10 great-grandchildren.

Death
Stubbs was diagnosed with cancer in 1995, and after suffering a stroke in 2000, he was no longer able to tour with the Four Tops. He died in his sleep on October 17, 2008, at his home in Detroit. A memorial service for Stubbs was held at the Greater Grace Temple in Detroit on October 27. Many of Stubbs' friends from the music industry attended including Berry Gordy, Martha Reeves, Brian Holland, Ali-Ollie Woodson and Dennis Edwards. Detroit City Council member JoAnn Watson, along with Martha Reeves, presented a resolution naming Stubbs' birthday "Levi Stubbs Day" in Detroit. Stubbs is interred at Detroit's historic Woodlawn Cemetery.

Cultural references
Stubbs features in Billy Bragg's 1986 song "Levi Stubbs' Tears", about a woman whose Four Tops cassette brings her comfort through difficult times.

Filmography

Film

Television

Soundtrack

References

External links

Levi Stubbs interview by Pete Lewis, 'Blues & Soul' October 1992

Obituary in Los Angeles Times
Obituary in The New York Times
Obituary on NPR Music

1936 births
2008 deaths
African-American male actors
American baritones
American male film actors
American male television actors
American male voice actors
American soul singers
Burials in Michigan
Deaths from cancer in Michigan
Male actors from Detroit
Motown artists
Four Tops members
The Midnighters members
Burials at Woodlawn Cemetery (Detroit)
American rhythm and blues singers
Singers from Detroit
20th-century American male actors
Pershing High School alumni
20th-century African-American male singers
21st-century African-American male singers